The Bahia heart-tongued frog (Phyllodytes melanomystax)  is a species of frog in the family Hylidae endemic to Brazil.
Its natural habitats are subtropical or tropical moist lowland forests, subtropical or tropical moist shrubland, and heavily degraded former forests.
It is threatened by habitat loss.

References 

Phyllodytes
Endemic fauna of Brazil
Amphibians described in 1992
Taxa named by Ulisses Caramaschi
Taxonomy articles created by Polbot